Andy Flickinger (born 4 November 1978) is a former French professional road bicycle racer. He won the GP Ouest-France in 2003.

Major results

1999
 8th Overall Étoile de Bessèges
 10th Trofeo Luis Puig
2002
 1st Stage 2 Paris–Corrèze
 3rd Overall Circuit des Mines
 5th Dwars door Vlaanderen
2003
 1st GP Ouest-France
 1st Classic de l'Indre
 1st Bordeaux–Caudéran
 Tour de France
Held  after Stage 1
 3rd A Travers le Morbihan
 5th Road race, National Road Championships
 5th Kuurne–Brussels–Kuurne
 5th Tour de Vendée
2005
 1st Stage 2a Circuit de la Sarthe
2007
 9th Overall Tour de Picardie

External links 

1978 births
Living people
People from Saint-Martin-d'Hères
French male cyclists
Sportspeople from Isère
Cyclists from Auvergne-Rhône-Alpes